Daniel Anthony "Danny" Price (born 15 September 1985) is a British retired professional boxer, best known for winning the national amateur title in 2006 at 201 lbs/91 kg.

Career

Amateur
The 1.98m/6'6 tall Price fights for Scarborough club Westway ABC. He is not related to David Price.

Price won Bronze at the 2004 junior world championships as a light heavyweight after losing to Ismaikel Perez by RSCO in the semis.

He defeated David Dolan at heavyweight at the Multi-Nations Tournament 2005 26:11.

He has had problems with the draw in international events so far. At the 2006 Commonwealth Games in Melbourne, Australia he controversially lost 12:16 his very first bout to local hero and the eventual winner Bradley Michael Pitt.
In December 2007 he became national champion vs. hard-hitting defending champ Tony Bellew 8:6.
As of 2006, his record was 41 wins in 49 fights.

At the 2007 World Amateur Boxing Championships he was again eliminated in the first round by the eventual winner Clemente Russo.
He won a couple of other tournaments such as the Finnish Tammer Tournament and a tournament in China.
He also bested American Quantis Graves at the UK-US duals 21:1.

At the first Olympic qualifier he lost to Ukrainian Oleksandr Usyk, at the second to Jozsef Darmos and didn't qualify.

Professional
He turned pro at Cruiserweight in 2011.

His cruiserweight career started successfully, beating experienced Hastings Rasani in one of his initial bouts.

Professional boxing record 

| style="text-align:center;" colspan="8"|9 Wins (3 Knockouts), 0 Defeats, 0 Draws
|-  style="text-align:center; background:#e3e3e3;"
|  style="border-style:none none solid solid; "|Res.
|  style="border-style:none none solid solid; "|Record
|  style="border-style:none none solid solid; "|Opponent
|  style="border-style:none none solid solid; "|Type
|  style="border-style:none none solid solid; "|Rd., Time
|  style="border-style:none none solid solid; "|Date
|  style="border-style:none none solid solid; "|Location
|  style="border-style:none none solid solid; "|Notes
|- align=center
|Win||9–0||align=left|  Michal Bilak
|||||
|align=left| 
|
|- align=center
|Win||8–0||align=left|  Tamas Bajzath
|||||
|align=left| 
|
|- align=center
|Win||7–0||align=left|  Jevgenijs Andrejevs 
||| ||
|align=left|
|align=left| 
|- align=center
|Win||6–0||align=left|  Hari Miles
||| ||
|align=left|
|align=left| 
|- align=center
|Win||5–0||align=left|  Moses Matovu
||| ||
|align=left|
|align=left| 
|- align=center
|Win||4–0||align=left|  John Anthony
||| ||
|align=left|
|align=left|
|- align=center
|Win||3–0||align=left| Tayar Mehmed
||| ||
|align=left|
|align=left|
|- align=center
|Win||2–0||align=left| Hastings Rasani
||| ||
|align=left|
|align=left|
|- align=center
|Win||1–0||align=left| Michal Tomko
|||||
|align=left|
|align=left|

References

External links

Bio
ABA
2006 nationals

Living people
English male boxers
1985 births
Heavyweight boxers
Sportspeople from Scarborough, North Yorkshire
Boxers at the 2006 Commonwealth Games
England Boxing champions
Commonwealth Games competitors for England